The New Fantastic Four (on-screen title: The Fantastic Four) is an animated series produced by DePatie–Freleng Enterprises and Marvel Comics Animation in 1978. It is the second animated series based on Marvel's comic book series Fantastic Four, following a 1967 series produced by Hanna-Barbera Productions.

The 1978 series replaced the character of the Human Torch with a robot named H.E.R.B.I.E. (Humanoid Experimental Robot, B-type, Integrated Electronics) because the 1978 television rights to use that character were tied up by a proposed television pilot movie in development by Universal Studios that ended up never being produced.

Ownership of the series passed to Disney in 2001 when Disney acquired Fox Kids Worldwide, which also includes Marvel Productions. The series is not available on Disney+.

Plot
After getting exposed to cosmic radiation, Reed Richards, Susan Storm, and Ben Grimm, alongside their robot H.E.R.B.I.E., fight crime as the Fantastic Four.

Episode list

Cast
 Ted Cassidy - Thing / Benjamin J. "Ben" Grimm, Mole Man
 Mike Road - Mister Fantastic / Reed Richards
 Dick Tufeld - Narrator
 Ginny Tyler - Invisible Girl / Susan "Sue" Richards
 Frank Welker - H.E.R.B.I.E., Impossible Man

Additional voices
 Joan Gerber
 Don Messick - J.J. Colossal
 Gene Moss - Trapster
 Vic Perrin
 Hal Smith 
 John Stephenson - Doctor Doom, Magneto, Karnak, Professor Gregson Gilbert, Presenter at Science Convention
 Nancy Wible

Marvel Mash-Up
In July 2012, scenes from Fantastic Four were re-cut, edited, and re-dubbed into comical shorts as part of Disney XD's comedic Marvel Mash-Up series of shorts for their "Marvel Universe on Disney XD" block of programming that included Ultimate Spider-Man and The Avengers: Earth's Mightiest Heroes.

Home media
The company Liberation Films was going to release this series on DVD in the UK in November 2008, but due to the company going into bankruptcy, that never happened. However the company Clear Vision in the UK which had acquired the rights to the Marvel shows, released the series on DVD in March, 2010.

Morningstar Entertainment has released 2 episodes on Region 1 DVD in Canada, however both The Impossible Man and Meet Dr. Doom are reissues of Volumes 2 and 7 of the 1980s Prism Video Marvel Comics Video Library. Both DVDs were mastered from VHS copies of those old releases, and therefore contain the Spider-Man episodes that were added on as bonus episodes to the VHS releases. Meet Doctor Doom is only available in the Villains Gift Set by Morningstar.

References

External links
 
 
 Marvel Animation Age: Fantastic Four (1978)
 The Dreamers: The New Fantastic Four (1978)

1970s American animated television series
1978 American television series debuts
1978 American television series endings
American children's animated action television series
American children's animated adventure television series
American children's animated science fantasy television series
American children's animated superhero television series
NBC original programming
Television series by DePatie–Freleng Enterprises
Fantastic Four television series
Television shows based on Marvel Comics
Animated television series based on Marvel Comics
Television series by Saban Entertainment
Television series by Disney–ABC Domestic Television